Embreeville Historic District is a national historic district located in Newlin Township, Chester County, Pennsylvania. It encompasses 12 contributing buildings along the east and west banks of the West Branch Brandywine Creek in the village of Embreeville. It includes a variety of vernacular, banked, stuccoed stone buildings.  They were largely built between about 1822 and 1842, with the earliest house built about 1760.  The buildings include a farmhouse, a country store, a storekeeper's house, a blacksmith's house, a wheelwright's house and store, a grist mill known as the Embreeville Mill, a "mansion" (1856), and miller's house.

It was added to the National Register of Historic Places in 1985.

Gallery

References

Historic districts on the National Register of Historic Places in Pennsylvania
Historic districts in Chester County, Pennsylvania
National Register of Historic Places in Chester County, Pennsylvania